The women's 5000 metres at the 2017 World Championships in Athletics was held at the London Olympic Stadium on 10 and 13 August.

Summary
In the first turn of the final, Kalkidan Gezahegne (BHR) started quickly to take a two-metre lead, covered quickly by 10,000 metre champ Almaz Ayana, revealing her intent to cover moves. Hellen Obiri (KEN) moved to Ayana's shoulder. Then Sifan Hassan ran around the crowd to take the lead. In control of the front, Hassan didn't speed up, she slowed the pace to a virtual walk. Everyone obliged until the last few metres when Ayana broke free off the front. They passed the first lap in 1:21.77. Ayana's second lap of 1:18.98 didn't improve the pace much, but it separated all three Ethiopians and all three Kenyans to the front. Gezahegne rushed forward to take another temporary lead before fading back through the pack for good. From there it was Ayana setting the pace, but a pack of others, led by Hellen Obiri (KEN) were determined not to let her get away. Ayana accelerated but Obiri stuck to her, creating a ten-second breakaway on the pack led by Hassan. With 300 metres to go, Obiri took off at a pace Ayana could not match, taking the pace from 68 second laps to the last 200 metres in under 30 seconds. Running even faster, Hasan separated from the pack and set off in chase of catching Ayana for silver but arriving two seconds too late.

Records
Before the competition, the records were as follows:

The following records were set at the competition:

Qualification standard
The standard to qualify automatically for entry was 15:22.00.

Schedule
The event schedule, in local time (UTC+1), is as follows:

Results

Heats
The first round took place on 10 August in two heats as follows:

The first five in each heat ( Q ) and the next five fastest ( q ) qualified for the final. The overall results were as follows:

Final
The final took place on 13 August at 19:35. The results were as follows: (photo finish)

References

5000
5000 metres at the World Athletics Championships
Women's sport in London